Kosów Lacki  is a town in Sokołów County, Masovian Voivodeship, Poland, with 2,152 inhabitants (2004).

History
1202 - First mention of a village Kossów found in documents belonging to prince Konrad Mazowiecki.
1723 - A permit was granted to organize a market twice a week and a fair four times in a year. Kosów was established as a town.
18th century - There were two schools in Kossów, in which 40 percent of the students were girls.
1869 - Civic rights were canceled, because Kosów participated in The January Uprising.
1964 - A picture by El Greco titled "" was found in the presbytery in Kosów Lacki.
01.01.2000 -  Restoration of civic rights.

References

External links
 Official town and commune webpage
 The diocesan museum in Siedlce (when is a El Greco picture ) webpage
 Jewish Community in Kosów Lacki on Virtual Shtetl

Cities and towns in Masovian Voivodeship
Sokołów County